Sundasalanx, the Sundaland noodlefishes, is the only genus in the family Sundasalangidae, which belongs to the same order as the herrings and their relatives.  This family of extremely small fishes is restricted to freshwater environments of Southeast Asia with Indonesia being home to the majority of species.   The seven currently recognized species in this genus are:
 Sundasalanx malleti Siebert & Crimmen, 1997
 Sundasalanx megalops Siebert & Crimmen, 1997
 Sundasalanx mekongensis Britz & Kottelat, 1999
 Sundasalanx mesops Siebert & Crimmen, 1997
 Sundasalanx microps T. R. Roberts, 1981
 Sundasalanx platyrhynchus Siebert & Crimmen, 1997
 Sundasalanx praecox T. R. Roberts, 1981 (dwarf noodlefish)

The FishBase classifies Sundasalanx as a pedomorphic genus within the family Clupeidae rather than as an independent family, while this is not consistent.

References

Fish of Asia
Taxa named by Tyson R. Roberts
Freshwater fish genera